Get Rollin' is the tenth studio album by Canadian rock band Nickelback. The album was released on November 18, 2022. The album's lead single "San Quentin" was released on September 7, 2022, accompanied by an official lyric video.

Background
In early 2019, band members spoke of recording a tenth studio album, though Chad Kroeger conceded there was no timetable or rush for the band to complete it. Mike Kroeger spoke of his personal desire to move in more of a heavy metal direction, or wanting to do an album of Slayer cover songs.

On August 14, 2020, the band released a cover of the Charlie Daniels Band song "The Devil Went Down to Georgia", featuring Dave Martone.

During a July 2021 interview, bassist Mike Kroeger commented when asked about the band's progress on new music saying "That is happening right now" he said of the forthcoming LP. “Music is being composed and recorded up in Canada. We were out there, and something came up and our producer had to take some time off. So I took that opportunity to return (home) to Los Angeles with family and spend a little bit of time at home. But I’ll be headed back up there in a couple of weeks to pick it up again." When the subject of a release date came up, Mike said “it’ll be done when it’s done”, explaining that he and band would rather not be confined to a timescale for fear of making “a shitty record”. “Release dates are primarily arrived at by business interests, like record labels and whatever. We don’t have one of those,” he said. “We’ve been managing ourselves for about a year. So, the answer is no. We’re doing it on our schedule, at our own pace, and it’ll be done when it’s done. ‘Cause we’ve blown up deadlines in the past lots of times. Because we feel that you can make a good record and be late, but you can’t, or you shouldn’t, make a shitty record to be on time. So we won’t be pressed for time.

Promotion and release
On August 31, 2022, video of the band's video-shoot for the lead single "San Quentin" was posted online by fans who attended video-shoot via their social media posts. The single was released on September 7, 2022.

During an interview with WRAT radio station, lead vocalist Chad Kroeger spoke about the lyrical inspiration for "San Quentin", saying: "I met the San Quentin prison warden at a party. And I couldn't believe how young he was. I was, like, 'There's just no way that you're the warden of San Quentin,' and everyone was, like, 'Yup. He is.' Guy Fieri's (American restaurateur, author and Emmy Award-winning television presenter) a buddy of mine, and I was at his birthday party a few years back. And the entire time we were talking, I'm speaking to this guy, but in my head all I could think about was, 'I'm gonna write a song called 'San Quentin'. That's it.' And I stuck it in my notes in my phone. And then once the riff was down, I think I screamed out this line, 'Can somebody please keep me the hell out of San Quentin?' And we just took it from there." 

"San Quentin" has been featured in the credits of Velma season 1.

Track listing
{{Track listing
| headline = ''Get Rollin track listing

| title1     = San Quentin
| writer1    = Chad Kroeger
| length1    = 3:31

| title2     = Skinny Little Missy
| writer2    = C. Kroeger
| length2    = 3:37

| title3     = Those Days
| writer3    = 
| length3    = 3:39

| title4     = High Time
| writer4    = 
| length4    = 3:54

| title5     = Vegas Bomb
| writer5    = C. Kroeger
| length5    = 3:45

| title6     = Tidal Wave
| writer6    = 
| length6    = 3:32

| title7     = Does Heaven Even Know You're Missing?
| writer7    = C. Kroeger
| length7    = 3:43

| title8     = Steel Still Rusts
| writer8    = C. Kroeger
| length8    = 4:27

| title9     = Horizon
| writer9    = 
| length9    = 3:15
 
| title10    = Standing in the Dark
| writer10   = 
| length10   = 4:01

| title11    = Just One More
| writer11   = 
| length11   = 3:38

| total_length = 41:02
}}

 Personnel NickelbackChad Kroeger – lead vocals, guitar, production
Ryan Peake – guitar, vocals, production
Mike Kroeger – bass guitar, production
Daniel Adair – drums, vocals, productionAdditional personnel'''
 Chris Baseford – production, mixing
 Jeff Johnson – production (tracks 3, 4)
 Ted Jensen – mastering
 Ricardo Germain – engineering
 Jessica Schmidt – production assistance
 Andrew Cruz – mixing assistance, digital editing
 Justin Schturz – mastering assistance
 Chris "Hollywood" Holmes – digital editing
 Ian Thornley – solo guitar (track 2)

Charts

References

2022 albums
Nickelback albums